Flavins (from Latin flavus, "yellow") are organic compounds, like their base, pteridine. They are formed by the tricyclic heterocycle isoalloxazine. The biochemical source is the vitamin riboflavin. The flavin moiety is often attached with an adenosine diphosphate to form flavin adenine dinucleotide (FAD), and, in other circumstances, is found as flavin mononucleotide (or FMN), a phosphorylated form of riboflavin. It is in one or the other of these forms that flavin is present as a prosthetic group in flavoproteins.

The flavin group is capable of undergoing oxidation-reduction reactions, and can accept either one electron in a two-step process or two electrons at once. Reduction is made with the addition of hydrogen atoms to specific nitrogen atoms on the isoalloxazine ring system:

In aqueous solution, flavins are yellow-coloured when oxidized, taking a red colour in the semi-reduced anionic state or blue in the neutral (semiquinone) state, and colourless when totally reduced. The oxidized and reduced forms are in fast equilibrium with the semiquinone (radical) form, shifted against the formation of the radical:

Flox + FlredH2 ⇌ FlH•

where Flox is the oxidized flavin, FlredH2 the reduced flavin (upon addition of two hydrogen atoms) and FlH• the semiquinone form (addition of one hydrogen atom).

In the form of FADH2, it is one of the cofactors that can transfer electrons to the electron transfer chain.

Photoreduction
Both free and protein-bound flavins are photoreducible, that is, able to be reduced by light, in a mechanism mediated by several organic compounds, such as some amino acids, carboxylic acids and amines. This property of flavins is exploited by various light-sensitive proteins. For example, the LOV domain, found in many species of plant, fungi and bacteria, undergoes a reversible, light-dependent structural change which involves the formation of a bond between a cysteine residue in its peptide sequence and a bound FMN.

FAD

Flavin adenine dinucleotide is a group bound to many enzymes including ferredoxin-NADP+ reductase, monoamine oxidase, D-amino acid oxidase, glucose oxidase, xanthine oxidase, and acyl CoA dehydrogenase.

FADH/FADH2
FADH and FADH2 are reduced forms of FAD. FADH2 is produced as a prosthetic group in succinate dehydrogenase, an enzyme involved in the citric acid cycle. In oxidative phosphorylation, two molecules of FADH2 typically yield 1.5 ATP each, or three ATP combined.

FMN

Flavin mononucleotide is a prosthetic group found in, among other proteins, NADH dehydrogenase, E.coli nitroreductase and old yellow enzyme.

See also 
Pteridine
Pterin
Deazaflavin (5-deazaflavin)

References

Further reading 

 

Cellular respiration